Chen Jue or Jue Chen is the name of:

Chen Jue (Southern Tang) (died 959), official of Yang Wu and Southern Tang during the Five Dynasties period
Chen Jue (revolutionary) (1903–1928), Chinese communist revolutionary and official
Chen Jue (athlete) (born 1988), Chinese sprinter
Jue Chen (scientist), Chinese-American biochemist
Jue Chen (singer) (born 1998), Chinese singer